Harry Becker may refer to:

 Harry Becker (artist) (1865–1928), English painter, draughtsman and printer
 Harry Becker (politician) (1892–1980), English politician